Ogidi may refer to:

Ogidi, Anambra State, a town in Nigeria
Ogidi, Kogi State, a town in Nigeria